Lougres is a commune in the Doubs department in the Bourgogne-Franche-Comté region in eastern France.

Geography

The commune takes its name from the stream that runs through it, from its source to the river Doubs.

Population

See also
 Communes of the Doubs department

References

External links

 Lougres on the intercommunal Web site of the department 

Communes of Doubs